Fräntorp is a district in Gothenburg, Sweden which belongs to Härlanda borough.

Gallery

Gothenburg
Populated places in Västra Götaland County